Holden is a town in Penobscot County, Maine, United States. The population was 3,277 at the 2020 census.

Geography

Demographics

As of 2000 the median income for a household in the town was $51,394, and the median income for a family was $62,208. Males had a median income of $39,427 versus $26,410 for females. The per capita income for the town was $25,047.  About 4.4% of families and 6.5% of the population were below the poverty line, including 5.0% of those under age 18 and 9.2% of those age 65 or over.

2010 census

As of the census of 2010, there were 3,076 people, 1,298 households, and 920 families residing in the town. The racial makeup of the town was 97.1% White, 0.5% African American, 0.7% Native American, 0.1% Asian, 0.2% Pacific Islander, 0.3% from other races, and 1.1% from two or more races. Hispanic or Latino of any race were 1.5% of the population.

There were 1,298 households, of which 26.3% had children under the age of 18 living with them, 59.2% were married couples living together, 8.0% had a female householder with no husband present, 3.7% had a male householder with no wife present, and 29.1% were non-families. 23.6% of all households were made up of individuals, and 8.4% had someone living alone who was 65 years of age or older. The average household size was 2.37 and the average family size was 2.79.

The median age in the town was 46.4 years. 19.9% of residents were under the age of 18; 6.5% were between the ages of 18 and 24; 21% were from 25 to 44; 38.1% were from 45 to 64; and 14.2% were 65 years  of age or older. The gender makeup of the town was 49.3% male and 50.7% female. In July 2015, former Maine State Representative Chris Greeley was named Chief of the Holden Police Department.

Schools

Holden is part of Maine School Administrative District 63, which also includes Clifton and Eddington. Holden Elementary School and Holbrook Middle School are the two schools that students attend in the area. After graduation from middle school, students can choose which of the local high schools they will attend.

References

External links
Town of Holden official website

Towns in Penobscot County, Maine
Towns in Maine